Municipal elections were held in Milan on 5 and 19 June 2016 to elect the Mayor and the 48 members of the City Council, as well as the nine presidents and 270 councillors of the nine administrative zones in which the municipality is divided, each one having one president and 30 councillors.

Incumbent Mayor Giuliano Pisapia choose not to run for re-election for a second term in office.

As no candidate won a majority in the first round, a runoff was held between the top two candidates – Giuseppe Sala, an independent business executive and Milan Expo 2015 CEO, close to the Democratic Party (PD), and Stefano Parisi, former CEO of the telecommunication company Fastweb close to Silvio Berlusconi's Forza Italia (FI) – which Sala won by a narrow margin.

The new Mayor was also appointed by law as general Mayor of the former Province of Milan now called Metropolitan City of Milan.

Background

Centre-left primary election
On 22 March 2015, the incumbent Mayor Giuliano Pisapia announced that he had chosen not to run for re-election in 2016 for a second term in office. Following Pisapia's decision, the ruling centre-left coalition decided to call an open primary election to choose a new mayoral candidate.

Four people registered to be candidates in this election: Giuseppe Sala, business executive and Milan Expo 2015 CEO; Francesca Balzani, deputy mayor, responsible for Budget in the Milan's municipal government and former MEP; Pierfrancesco Majorino, responsible for Social Equalities in the municipal government of the city; Antonio Iannetta, former president of UISP (Italian Sport Union for Everyone).

The election took place on 6–7 February 2016:

Total voters: 60,900

Centre-right candidacy
On 10 February 2016, Stefano Parisi, former City manager of Milan (1997-2001), announced his acceptance to become the centre-right coalition candidate for the mayoral election, a role proposed to him by the former Prime Minister Silvio Berlusconi.
Parisi is also the former CEO of the telecommunication company Fastweb; Parisi in last 2015 was the manager of Corrado Passera's early mayoral campaign for their party, Unique Italy: Passera retired to run for Major when Parisi resigned after a meeting with Berlusconi.

Others
On 8 November 2015, the anti-establishment Five Star Movement choose its own candidate with a closed primary election. The 52-year-old unemployed activist Patrizia Bedori was chosen as official mayoral candidate. On that date no official data were provided by the movement. However, on 12 March 2016 Bedori stepped down from the candidacy, saying tearful during an assembly that she wasn't the right person to represent the movement. Afterwards on 24 March 2016 with a closed virtual primary on the web, the Five Star Movement choose its new candidate, Gianluca Corrado, who received 632 votes out of 876.

Voting system
The semipresidential voting system is used for all mayoral elections in Italy of cities with a population higher than 15,000 for the sixth time. Under this system voters express a direct choice for the mayor or an indirect choice voting for the party of the candidate's coalition. If no candidate receives at least 50% of votes, the top two candidates go to a second round after two weeks. This gives a result whereby the winning candidate may be able to claim majority support.

For the zones the voting system is the same, not referred to the mayor but to the president of the zones.

The election of the City Council is based on a direct choice for the candidate with a preference vote: the candidate with the majority of the preferences is elected. The number of the seats for each losing party is determined proportionally.

Parties and candidates
This is a list of the major parties (and their respective leaders) which participated in the election.

Opinion polling

Results

Note: if a defeated candidate for Mayor obtained over 3% of votes, the mayoral candidate is automatically elected city councilor.

The candidate elected Major is not a member of the City Council, but has the right to vote in the City Council; if Stefano Parisi will resign, his seat in the City Council will pass to Riccardo De Corato (former Deputy Major, 1997-2011), first candidate of Brothers of Italy (FdI), because this list is the first list in the coalition under the electoral threshold.

Results by municipio

Presidents and Councils

After the 2011 election, all nine municipi were governed by the centre-left. Following the 2016 election, five were gained by the centre-right coalition and four by the centre-left.

Table below shows the results for each municipio with the percentage for each candidate and president elected:

Source: Municipality of Milan - Electoral Service

Table below shows the seats for each coalition in every Municipal Council:

Source: Municipality of Milan - Electoral Service

Mayoral votes

Second round
Table below shows the results of the votes for mayoral candidates on the second round (19 June 2016) in each municipio:

See also
 2016 Italian local elections

References

2016 elections in Italy
Milan
Milan
Elections in Milan
2010s in Milan
June 2016 events in Italy